Azygophleps leopardina is a moth in the family Cossidae. It is found in South Africa, Zambia, Namibia and Kenya.

References

Moths described in 1902
Azygophleps
Moths of Africa
Insects of Namibia